Sefer Zerubavel, also called the Book of Zerubbabel or the Apocalypse of Zerubbabel, is a medieval Hebrew apocalypse written at the beginning of the 7th century CE in the style of biblical visions (e.g. Daniel, Ezekiel) placed into the mouth of Zerubbabel, the last descendant of the Davidic line to take a prominent part in Israel's history, who laid the foundation of the Second Temple in the 6th century BCE. The enigmatic postexilic biblical leader receives a revelatory vision outlining personalities and events associated with the restoration of Israel, the End of Days, and the establishment of the Third Temple.

History 
The groundwork for the book was probably written in Palestine between 629 and 636, during fierce struggles between Persia and the Byzantine Empire for control of the Holy Land (qq.v. Byzantine-Arab Wars, Muslim conquest of Syria). These wars touched Byzantine Palestine and stirred Messianic hopes among Jews, including the author for whom the wars appear to be eschatological events leading to the appearance of the Messiah. Armilus is thought to be a cryptogram for Heraclius, and that the events described in the Sefer Zerubbabel coincide with the Jewish revolt against Heraclius. However, firm evidence of the work's existence prior to the tenth century is elusive. The Zohar is cognizant of the legend of Hephzibah, whom the apocalypse first names as the mother of the Davidic Messiah and a female warrior credited with killing multiple evil kings. Rabbis Saadia Gaon (892–942) and Hai ben Sherira Gaon (939–1038) probably knew the book, but never mention it by name.

Sefer Zerubbabel is extant in a number of manuscript and print recensions. What may be the oldest manuscript copy is part of a prayer book reportedly dated to about 840 CE.

The first publication was in 1519 in Constantinople within an anthology called Liqqutim Shonim. It was reprinted again along with the Sefer Malkiel in Vilna in 1819, and again by Adolph Jellinek in his Bet Ha-Midrasch (1853–77) and S. A. Wertheimer in his Leqet Midrashim (Jerusalem, 1903). The fullest edition of the work was prepared by Israel Levi in his book L'apocalypse.

Because the book gave an unequivocal date (1058 CE) for the return of the Messiah, it exerted great influence upon contemporary Messianic thought. The book is mentioned by Eleazar of Worms and supposedly by Rashi. Abraham ibn Ezra criticized the book as "unreliable."

One edition of the Pirke Hekalot gave a figure of 890 years until the return of the Messiah, making the Messianic year 958 CE, within a decade of the birth of Saadia Gaon. That date perhaps led to a message sent by Rhenish Jews to Palestine inquiring after rumors of the Messiah's advent.

Contents 
The sefer describes the eschatological struggle between the Antichrist Armilus, who is the leader of Rome and Christianity, and the Messiah ben Joseph, who fails in battle but paves the way for the Davidic Messiah and the ultimate triumph of righteousness. The original author expected the Messiah would come in the immediate future; subsequent editors substituted later dates.

Set after Nebuchadnezzar's destruction of Jerusalem, the book begins with Zerubbabel, whose name was associated with the first restoration, receiving a vision after praying for "knowledge of the form of the eternal house." In the vision he is transported by the angel Metatron to Ninevah, the "city of blood" representing Rome by which the author likely means Byzantium. There he finds in the marketplace a "bruised and despised man" named Menahem ben Ammiel who reveals himself to be the Messiah ben David, doomed to abide there until his appointed hour. Zerubbabel asks when the lamp of Israel would be kindled. Metatron interjects that the Messiah would return 990 years after the destruction of the Temple (approximately 1058 CE).

Five years prior to the coming of Hephzibah, who would be the mother of the Messiah ben David, the Messiah ben Joseph, Nehemiah ben Hushiel, will appear but he will be slain by Armilus. Afterwards, the Messiah ben David will resurrect him. The Sefer Zerubbabel mentions Gog and Armilos rather than Gog and Magog as the enemies.

In the narrative Zerubbabel is led to a "house of disgrace" (a church), a kind of antitemple. There he sees a beautiful statue of a woman (the Virgin Mary). With Satan as the father, the statue gives birth to the Antichrist Armilus. Forces associated with Armilus and the antitemple come to rule over the entire world. But in the end these forces are defeated. The work concludes with Zerubbabel's vision of the descent of the Heavenly Temple to earth. Thus the "form of the eternal house" is revealed; unlike the Second Temple it is made in heaven.

According to Martha Himmelfarb (2002) alongside from a passage in the Tractate Berakhot 2.4 10ff in the Talmud Yerushalmi, dealing with the mother of the Messiah Menahem ben Ammiel, Sefer Zerubbabel is the only early Jewish text to import a mother of the Messiah into Judaism. In the Sefer Zerubbabel Menahem is Menahem ben Ammiel, and his mother is Hephzibah, the same name as the wife of Hezekiah and mother of Manasseh. Hephzibah plays an important role as she finds and uses Aaron's rod.

See also 
Jewish eschatology
Midrash Vayosha

References

External links 
English translation of SEFER ZERUBBABEL

Apocalyptic literature
Hebrew manuscripts
Jewish medieval literature
Jewish messianism